The history of Shanghai spans over a thousand years and closely parallels the development of modern China. Originally a small agricultural village, Shanghai developed during the late Qing dynasty (1644–1912) as one of China's principal trading ports. Although nominally part of China, in practice foreign diplomats controlled the city under the policy of extraterritoriality. Since the economic reforms of the early 1990s the city has burgeoned to become one of Asia's major financial centers and the world's busiest container port.

Early Era 

Around 6000 BCE, only the western part of the Shanghai region encompassing today's Qingpu, Songjiang and Jinshan districts were dry land formed by lacustrine silting from ancient Lake Tai. The modern Jiading, Minhang and Fengxian districts emerged around 1,000 BC while the downtown area remained underwater.

The earliest Neolithic settlements known in this area date to the Majiabang culture  (50003300 BCE). This was overlapped by the Songze culture between around 3800–3300 BCE. In the lower stratum of the Songze excavation site in the modern-day Qingpu District, archaeologists found the prone skeleton of one of the Shanghai's earliest inhabitantsa 25-30-year-old male with an almost complete skull dated to the Majiabang era.

By the 4th and 5th centuries CE, during the Eastern Jin dynasty (317420), a thriving fishing industry had developed along the Song Rivernow known as Suzhou Creek,a tributary of the Huangpu River. The character Hu is still used as an abbreviation to denote the city, for example on car license plates. Qinglong Zhen, the "Garrison of the Green Dragon", the first garrison in this area, was founded in 746 during the Tang dynasty (618–907) in what is now the Qingpu District of Shanghai. Five years later, Huating Zhèn followed, demonstrating the growth of the region and its increasing political and geographical importance.

In 1074, Emperor Shenzong of Song, established a Marine Office and a Goods Control Bureau north-west of Huating Zhen at the approximate location of Shanghai's old city, adjacent to a ditch or pu that ran north into Suzhou Creek and allowed for the loading and unloading of freight.

Later on, the area's proximity to Hangzhou, the capital of the Southern Song dynasty (1127-1279), proved beneficial. Along with its commercial activities, Qinglong Zhen became a military and naval base and by the early 12th century a Superintendent of Foreign Trade was established in the settlement to supervise trade and tax collections across five counties. As a result, the flourishing and prosperous town earn the sobriquet "Little Hangzhou."

According to official government sources, Shanghai first became a city in 1291 during the Yuan dynasty (1271–1368). At this time, five of Huating Zhen's villages were amalgamated to form a new Shanghai County on the site of the modern city centre. This new settlement had a population of about 300,000 with many engaged in the shipping trade.

Ming dynasty 

By the early 15th century, Shanghai had become important enough for Ming dynasty engineers to begin dredging the Huangpu River (also known as Shen). In 1553, a city wall was built around the Old Town (Nanshi) as a defense against the depredations of the Wokou (Japanese pirates). Shanghai had its first contact with the Jesuits in 1603 when the Shanghai scholar-bureaucrat Xu Guangqi was baptized by Jesuit priest Matteo Ricci. Xu later bequeathed some of his land in Shanghai, today's Xujiahui, meaning Xu family village, to the Catholic Church. By the end of the Ming dynasty in 1644, Shanghai had become a major cotton and textile center with a population that would soon reach 200,000.

Qing dynasty 

During the late Qing dynasty, Shanghai's economy began to rival that of the traditionally larger market at Suzhou. In the 18th and early 19th centuries, exports of cotton, silk, and fertilizer reached as far as Polynesia and Persia.

In 1832, the East India Company explored Shanghai and the Yangzi River as a potential trading center for tea, silk, and opium, but were rebuffed by local officials. Chinese attempts to prohibit the opium trade into China led to the First Opium War (1839-1842) with the United Kingdom; the Treaty of Nanjing, which concluded the war with a British victory, opened up five treaty ports in China to British merchants, including Shanghai. Similar treaties were quickly signed with other Western nations, and French, American and German merchants joined their British counterparts in establishing a presence in Shanghai, residing in sovereign concessions where they were not subject to Chinese laws. The British established their concession in 1845, the Americans in 1848 in Hongkou, north of Suzhou Creek, and the French set up their concession in 1849 west of the old Chinese city and south of the British Concession. In 1846, Peter Richards founded Richards' Hotel, the first western hotel in China. It would later become the Astor House. In 1850, the first English-language newspaper in Shanghai, the North China Herald, was launched.

The Taiping Rebellion was the largest of a number of widespread rebellions against the hugely unpopular Qing regime. In 1853, Shanghai was occupied by a triad offshoot of the rebels called the Small Swords Society. The fighting devastated much of the countryside but left the foreign settlements untouched. 

In 1854 a group of Western businessmen met and formed the Shanghai Municipal Council to organise road repairs, refuse clearance and tax collection across the concessions. In 1863 the American concession (land fronting the Huangpu River to the north-east of Suzhou Creek) officially joined the British Settlement (stretching from Yang-ching-pang Creek to Suzhou Creek) to become the Shanghai International Settlement. Its waterfront became the internationally famous Bund. The Shanghai French Concession, to the west of the old town, remained independent and the Chinese retained control over the original walled city and the area surrounding the foreign enclaves. By the late-1860s Shanghai's official governing body had been practically transferred from the individual concessions to the Shanghai Municipal Council. The International Settlement was wholly foreign-controlled with the British holding the largest number of seats on the council and heading all the Municipal departments. No Chinese residing in the International Settlement were permitted to join the council until 1928.

Jardine's attempt to construct the Woosung "Road" railway in 1876China's firstproved initially successful until the death of a soldier on the tracks prompted the Chinese government to demand its nationalization. Upon the last payment in 1877, the local viceroy ordered the profitable railway dismantled and removed to Taiwan. The telegraph that had been strung along the line of the railwayalso China's firstwas, however, allowed to remain in operation.

By the mid-1880s, the Shanghai Municipal Council had a practical monopoly over a large part of the city's services. It bought up all the local gas-suppliers, electricity producers and water-companies. In the early 20th century, it took control over all non-private rickshaws and the Settlement tramways. It also regulated opium sales and prostitution until their banning in 1918 and 1920 respectively.

The Treaty of Shimonoseki which ended the First Sino-Japanese War saw Japan emerge as an additional foreign power in Shanghai. Japan built the first factories in Shanghai, which were soon followed by other foreign powers. The Chinese defeat also spurred reformers within the Qing government to modernize more quickly, leading to the reëstablishment of the Songhu Railway and its expansion into the Shanghai–Nanjing Railway.

Republic of China 

The 1911 Xinhai Revolution, spurred in part by actions against the native-owned railways around Shanghai, led to the establishment of the Republic of China. During that time, Shanghai became the focal point of many activities that would eventually shape modern China.

In 1936, Shanghai was one of the largest cities in the world with 3 million inhabitants.  Of those, only 35,000-50,000 were of European origin, but these controlled half the city under the unequal treaties that provided extraterritoriality until 1943.  Many White Russians fled to China after the 1917 Russian Revolution, trickling to Shanghai along the 1920s. The number of people with Russian origins was about 35,000 by the 1930s, well exceeding number of other people with European origin. These Shanghai Russians were sometimes poorly regarded by westerners, as their general poverty led them to take jobs considered unsuitable for Europeans, including prostitution. However, among Russian emigration was layered, also including several well-to-do members. Russian artists dominated Shanghai's artistic life almost single-handedly. Many Jewish refugees from Nazi Germany arrived in the 1930s.

The city was thus divided between its more European western half and the more traditionally Chinese eastern half. New inventions like electricity and trams were quickly introduced, and Westerners helped transform Shanghai into a metropolis. British and American businessmen made a great deal of money in trade and finance, and Germans used Shanghai as a base for investing in China. Shanghai accounted for half of the imports and exports of China. The western part of Shanghai grew to a size four times larger than the Chinese part had been in the early 20th century.

European and American inhabitants of Shanghai called themselves the Shanghailanders. After problems during its initial few years, the Public Garden north of the BundChina's first public park and today's Huangpu Parkwas for decades reserved for the foreign nationals and forbidden to Chinese natives. The International Settlement was built in the British style with a large racetrack at the site of today's People's Square. A new class emerged, the compradors, which mixed with the local landlords to form a new class, a Chinese bourgeoisie. The compradors were indispensable mediators for the western companies. Many compradors were on the leading edge of the movement to modernize China. Shanghai was then the biggest financial city in East Asia.

Chinese society 
Chinese society was divided into native place associations or provincial guilds. These guilds defended the interests of traders from shared hometowns. They had their own dress codes and sub-cultures. Chinese government was hardly organized, for the foreign governments controlled the economy. Instead, society was controlled by the native place associations. The Guangdong native place associations represented the skilled workers of Shanghai. These native place associations belonged to the top of Shanghainese society. The Ningbo and Jiangsu native place associations were the most numerous. They represented the common workers. Some came from the north of China. They were on the bottom rung of the social ladder. Many of them were forced to work as seasonal workers or even mobsters.

Shanghai Grand
During the 1920s and 1930s Shanghai became known as "The Paris of the East, the New York of the West". Shanghai was made a special city in 1927, and a municipality in May 1930. The city's industrial and financial power increased, because the merchants were in control of the city,  while the rest of China was divided among warlords.

Artistically, Shanghai became the hub for three new art forms: Chinese cinema, Chinese animation, and Chinese popular music. Other forms of entertainment included Lianhuanhua comic books.  The architectural style at the time was modeled after British and American designs. Many of the grandest-scale buildings on The Bundsuch as Shanghai Club, the Asia Building and the HSBC Buildingwere constructed or renovated at this time. The city created a distinct image that separated it from all other Chinese cities that had come before it.

"Bizarre advertising displays were an everyday reality ... though I sometimes wonder if everyday reality was the one element missing from the city," British novelist J. G. Ballard, who was born and raised in Shanghai during this era, recalled in his autobiography. "I would see something strange and mysterious, but treat it as normal ... Anything was possible, and everything could be bought and sold." The experience inspired much of his later fiction.

Economic achievements include the city becoming the commercial center of East Asia, attracting banks from all over the world.  When movies and literature depict the golden days of by-gone Shanghai, it is generally associated with this era.

Power struggle

The city was also the center of national and international opium smuggling during the 1920s. In the 1930s, "The Great World" amusement palace was a place where opium, prostitution and gambling came together under the leadership of gangster Huang Jinrong also known as "Pockmarked Huang". Huang was the highest-ranked Chinese detective in the French Concession Police (FCP) and employed Green Gang (Qing Bang) leader Du Yuesheng as his gambling and opium enforcer. The Green Gang became a major influence in the Shanghai International Settlement, with the Commissioner of the Shanghai Municipal Police reporting that corruption associated with the trade had affected a large proportion of his force. An extensive crackdown in 1925 simply displaced the focus of the trade to the neighboring French Concession.

Meanwhile, traditional division of society by native place associations was falling apart. The new working classes were not prepared to listen to the bosses of the same native place associations during the 1910s. Resentment against the foreign presence in Shanghai rose among both the entrepreneurs and the workers of Shanghai. In 1919, protests by the May Fourth Movement against the Treaty of Versailles led to the rise of a new group of philosophers like Chen Duxiu and Hu Shih who challenged Chinese traditionalism with new ideologies. Books like New Youth disseminated the new school of thought, while crime and warlord banditry convinced many that the existing government was largely ineffective. In this atmosphere, the Chinese Communist Party was founded in Shanghai in 1921.

The Nationalist leader Chiang Kai-shek and the Shanghailanders entered into an informal alliance with the Green Gang, which acted against the Communists and organized labor unions. The nationalists had cooperated with gang leaders since the revolution. Although sporadic fighting between gangsters and communists had occurred previously, many communists were killed in a major surprise attack during the April 12 Incident in the Chinese-administered part of Shanghai. Suspected leftists were shot on sight, so that manyincluding Zhou Enlaifled the city.

In the late 1920s and early '30s, large residential areas were built north of the foreign concessions. These residential areas were modern, with good roads and parking lots for automobiles. A new Chinese port was built, which could compete with the Shanghailanders' ports. Chiang Kai-shek continuously demanded large amounts of money from the financial world in Shanghai. Most bankers and merchants were willing to invest in the army, but this stopped in 1928. Chiang responded by nationalizing all enterprises. T. V. Soong, Chiang's brother-in-law, chastised his erstwhile relative, writing that it is better to strengthen the party and the economy as well instead of focusing only on the army.

Supported by the progressive native place associations, Chiang Kai-shek's rule turned increasingly autocratic. The power of the gangsters rose in the early 1930s, especially the power of the Green Gang leader Du Yuesheng who started his own native place association. Chiang Kai-shek chose to cooperate with gangsters in order to maintain his grip on Chinese society. This meant that the gangsters remained middlemen during the rule of the nationalists, controlling society by frequently organizing strikes.  Mobsters stormed the Shanghai Stock Exchange to gain control over it. No one interfered: the police because they had been dominated by the mobsters since 1919,  the Shanghailanders because it was an internal Chinese affair, and the nationalists because they were trying to break the power of the entrepreneurs.  The entrepreneurs were forced to make a deal after a second raid.

Greater Shanghai Plan 

In 1927, the government of the Nationalist Government of the Republic of China drew up a plan to develop land in the north east of the city adjacent to the Huangpu River. In 1922, this area had also been earmarked by Sun Yat-sen, founder of the Chinese Republic, as the center of China's development plans with a view to Shanghai becoming a global commercial centre. By 1931, the new Shanghai Special City Government had approved and started work on the Greater Shanghai Plan utilising ideas drawn from British expert Ebenezer Howard's 1902 book Garden Cities of Tomorrow. The grid layout of the new area also followed contemporary trends in European and American urban planning.

End of Old Shanghai (1937–1945)

World War II and the Japanese Occupation
The Imperial Japanese Navy Air Service bombed Shanghai on January 28, 1932, nominally to crush Chinese student protests against the Japanese occupation of Manchuria. The Chinese fought back in what was known as the January 28 Incident. The two sides fought to a standstill and a ceasefire was brokered in May.

During the Second Sino-Japanese War, the Chinese-controlled parts of the city fell after the 1937 Battle of Shanghai (known in China as the Battle of Songhu). The foreign concessions, which remained largely intact, entered what became known as the "Solitary Island" period — an enclave of prosperity surrounded by war zones — attracting some 400,000 Chinese refugees in 4 years. Tensions within the city led to a wave of assassinations against Chinese officials who worked with the Japanese authorities: during January and February, 1939, 16 pro-Japanese officials and businessmen were assassinated by Chinese resistance organizations. With the beginning of the Pacific War, the foreign concessions too were occupied by Japan on 8 December 1941.

Shanghai suffered less than many other cities during World War II, and the Japanese occupiers attempted to maintain many aspects of life as they had been before. The Shanghai Race Club reopened soon after the occupation and continued to host races throughout the war, even after most British and American Shanghai residents were interned. The races continued as late as August, 1945.

During World War II, the extraterritoriality of the foreign concessions provided a haven for visa-less European refugees. It was, along with Francoist Spain, the only location in the world unconditionally open to Jews at the time. However, under pressure from their ally Nazi Germany, the Japanese removed the Jews in late 1941 to what became known as the Shanghai ghetto, where hunger and infectious diseases such as dysentery became rife. The foreign population rose from 35,000 in 1936 to 150,000 in 1942 (Jewish immigration was 20000-25000 from 1933 to 1941). The Japanese were still harsher on belligerent nationals: Britons, Americans and the Dutch. These slowly lost their privileges and had to wear lettersB, A, or Nwhen walking in public places; their villas were turned into brothels and gambling houses., and they were finally interned in concentration camps, notably Lunghua Civilian Assembly Center, in 1943. The whole of Shanghai remained under Japanese occupation until the surrender of Japan on 15 August 1945.

End of the Foreign Concessions
Following the attack on Pearl Harbor, the Japanese ended all foreign concessions in Shanghai except for the French. This state of affairs was conceded by an Anglo-Chinese Friendship Treaty in 1943. The French themselves ceded their privileges in 1946 following the end of World War II.

Tightened Communist rule (1949–1980s)

Communist Transition

Towards the end of the Chinese Civil War on May 27, 1949, Shanghai came under Communist control. Although the Republic of China Army vowed to make the city "China's Stalingrad" and the local population supported the Kuomintang, it surrendered to Chen Yi's People's Liberation Army forces with minimal resistance. 

One of the first actions taken in the Chinese Communist Revolution was to kill people considered counter-revolutionaries.  Places such as the Canidrome were transformed from elegant ballrooms to mass execution facilities. This included the mass arrest of thousands of vagrants, criminals, and rickshaw drivers beginning in December 1949, alongside a broader crackdown on gambling and prostitution. This reality has been largely censored, despite numerous western texts describing the hostile takeover following the arrival of the People's Liberation Army.

Most foreign firms moved their offices from Shanghai to Hong Kong, specifically North Point, whose Eastern District became known as "Little Shanghai". Although the Communists initially tried to allow the city relative autonomy, its economy declined due to a Taiwanese blockade and Communist restrictions on foreign trade.

Home of leftism
Shanghai was, along with Beijing, the only former ROC municipality not merged into neighboring provinces over the next decade. Shanghai then underwent a series of changes in the boundaries of its subdivisions.

During the 1950s and 1960s, Shanghai became an industrial center and center for revolutionary leftism. The city stagnated economically during the Maoist era. Shanghai remained the largest contributor of tax revenue to the central government, but this came at the cost of severely crippling Shanghai's infrastructure, capital, and artistic development. This also initially denied economic freedoms to the city that were later available to southern provinces such as Guangdong. During the mid-1980s, Guangdong province paid nearly no taxes to the central government and thus was perceived as fiscally expendable. Guangdong would benefit from Chinese economic reform under Deng Xiaoping, while Shanghai would have to wait another decade until 1991.

Economic and cultural rebound (1990s–Present)

Although political power in Shanghai has traditionally been seen as a stepping stone to higher positions within the PRC central government, the city's modern transformation really did not begin until the third generation General Secretary of the Chinese Communist Party Jiang Zemin came to power in 1989. Along with his premier Zhu Rongji, Jiang represented the politically right-of-center "Shanghai clique" and began reducing the tax burden on Shanghai. Encouraging both foreign and domestic investment, he sought to promote the cityparticularly the Lujiazui area of Pudongas the economic hub of East Asia and gateway to the Chinese interior. Since that time, Shanghai has led China's overall development and experienced continuous economic growth of between 9–15% annuallyarguably at the expense of Hong Kong.

Shanghai is China's largest and greatest commercial and industrial city. With 0.1% of the land area of the country, it supplies over 12% of the municipal revenue and handles more than a quarter of total trade passing through China's ports. Its year 2010 population, according to China's latest census, was 23.02 million and represented an increase of 6.61 million from the 2000 census.

The average size of a family in Shanghai declined to fewer than three people during the 1990s, and it is clear that most of Shanghai's population growth is driven by migration rather than natural factors based on high birth and fertility rates. Shanghai has for many years had the lowest birth rate in China, a rate lower than large American cities such as New York.

As with most cities in China, Shanghai is overbounded in its administrative territory. The city in the year 2010 was composed of 16 districts and one county, together occupying  of land area. Chongming contains substantial rural land and a number of rural residents who continue to farm for their livelihood. The city has the highest population density of all the first-order administrative units in China, with 3630.5/km2 (9402.9/sq mi) in 2010. Owing to its continued growth and industrial and commercial development, Shanghai also has the highest index of urbanization among all of China's first order administrative units, with 89.3% of the official population (20.6 million) classified as urban.

The amount of building activity in Shanghai fueled by government investment expenditures continues to be astounding. Since the 1980s, Shanghai's economy shifted from over 77% of gross domestic product in secondary sector manufacturing to a more balanced sectoral distribution of 48% in industry and 51% in services in 2000 and 2001. Employment in manufacturing reached almost 60% in 1990 and has declined steadily since to 41% in 2001, while employment in the tertiary sector has grown from 30% in 1990 to more than 47% in 2001.

The rapid growth in population, factories and motor vehicles has generated environmental issues. Experts say the chief problems involve air and water pollution and the accumulation of solid wastes.

See also

 Timeline of Shanghai history
 The Shanghai Document, a documentary film portraying Shanghai in the early 1920s

Notes

References

Citations

Sources

Further reading

 Arkaraprasertkul, Non. "Power, politics, and the making of Shanghai." 'Journal of Planning History 9.4 (2010): 232-259, since 1980
 Balfour, Alan and Zheng Zhiling, Shanghai (Chichester 2002).
 Bergère, Marie-Claire. Shanghai: China's Gateway to Modernity (Stanford University Press, 2009). 497pp
 Bickers, Robert. "Shanghailanders: The formation and identity of the British settler community in Shanghai 1843-1937." Past and Present (1998): 161-211. in JSTOR
 Bracken, Gregory. "Treaty Ports in China: Their Genesis, Development, and Influence." Journal of Urban History (2019), Vol. 45 Issue 1, pp 168-176. online
 Carter, James. Champions Day: The End of Old Shanghai (W.W. Norton, 2020).   abstract; about November 12, 1941
 Chen, Xiangming. Shanghai Rising: State Power and Local Transformations in a Global Megacity (2009)  excerpt and text search
 Denison, E. and Guan Yu Ren. Building Shanghai: The Story of China's Gateway (Wiley-Academy, 2006)
 Dillon, Nara, and Jean Oi, eds. At the Crossroads of Empires: Middlemen, Social Networks, and State-Building in Republican Shanghai (2007) excerpt and text search
 Fung, Ka‐Iu; Yan, et al. “Shanghai: China’s World City.” In Yue‐man Yeung and Xu‐wei Hu, eds., China's Coastal Cities: Catalysts for Modernization (University of Hawaii Press, 1992)
  Gamble, Jos. Shanghai in Transition: Changing Perspectives and Social Contours of a Chinese Metropolis (2002) excerpt
 Horesh, Niv. "Location Is (Not) Everything: Re-Assessing Shanghai’s Rise, 1840s-1860s." Provincial China 1.2 (2009). online
 Horesh, Niv. Shanghai, past and present: A concise socio-economic history, 1842–2012 (Sussex Academic, 2015).
 Ji, Zhaojin. A History of Modern Shanghai Banking: The Rise and Decline of China's Financial Capitalism (2003)
 Johnson, Linda. Shanghai: From Market Town to Treaty Port, 1074-1858 (Stanford University Press, 1995)
 Keller, Wolfgang, Ben Li, and Carol H. Shiue. "Shanghai's Trade, China's Growth: Continuity, Recovery, and Change since the Opium Wars." IMF Economic Review 61#2 (2013): 336-378. covers 1840s-2010. online; many tables and graphs.
 King, A. H. ed. Eastern banking: essays in the history of the Hongkong and Shanghai Banking Corporation (1983) online
 Lee, Leo Ou-fan, and Oufan Li. Shanghai modern: The flowering of a new urban culture in China, 1930-1945 (Harvard University Press, 1999).
 Lu Hanchao. Beyond the Neon Lights: Everyday Shanghai in the Early Twentieth Century (U of California Press,  1999)
 Wasserstrom, Jeffrey N. "New approaches to old Shanghai." Journal of Interdisciplinary History 32.2 (2001): 263-279 online review of Lu
 Murphey, Rhoades. Shanghai, Key to Modern China (Harvard University Press, 1953)
 Nield, Robert. "The China Coast: Trade and the First Treaty Ports". Hong Kong: Joint Publishing Co, 2010.
 Tian, Gang. Shanghai's role in the Economic Development of China: Reform of Foreign Trade and Development (Praeger, 1996)
 Wakeman Jr., Frederic. Policing Shanghai, 1927-1937 (1996) excerpt
  Walker, Kathryn. Shanghai (1957), 48pp; for middle schools. online
 Wasserstrom, Jeffrey N. Global Shanghai, 1850-2010: A History in Fragments (2008) excerpt and text search
 Xu, Xiaoqun. Chinese professionals and the republican state: The rise of professional associations in Shanghai, 1912–1937 (Cambridge University Press, 2000)
 Yan Jin. "Shanghai Studies: An evolving academic field" History Compass (October 2018) e12496 Historiography of recent scholarship. online
 Yeh, Wen-hsin. Shanghai Splendor: A Cultural History, 1843-1949 (2008)
 Yeh, Wen-hsin. "Corporate space, communal time: everyday life in Shanghai's Bank of China." American Historical Review 100.1 (1995): 97-122 online.
 Yeung, Y.M. and Sung Yun‐wing, eds.Shanghai: Transformation and Modernization under China's Open Policy (Hong Kong: Chinese University Press, 1996).

Historiography
 Jin, Yan. "Shanghai Studies: An evolving academic field." History Compass 16.11 (2018): e12496  https://doi.org/10.1111/hic3.12496
 Wasserstrom, Jeffrey N. "Is global Shanghai 'good to think'? Thoughts on comparative history and post-socialist cities." Journal of World History (2007): 199-234.
 Wasserstrom, Jeffrey N. "New approaches to old Shanghai." Journal of Interdisciplinary History 32.2 (2001): 263-279 online review of Lu (1999)

 Primary sources 
 Historical accounts written about Shanghai
  
 
 Arnold Wright, Twentieth century impressions of Hongkong, Shanghai, and other treaty ports of China: their history, people, commerce, industries, and resources'' (1908). online